Sir Joseph Turner Hutchinson (28 March 1850 – 20 January 1924) was an English judge who served as the 19th Chief Justice of Ceylon.

Early life and background

He was born on 28 March 1850 in Braystones, Cumberland, England to Isaac Hutchinson and Hannah Turner.

Education

He was educated at St Bees School. Admitted to Christ's College, Cambridge 11 October 1869, he gained a B.A. in 1873, and an M.A. in 1876. Subsequently, he was admitted to the Middle Temple 20 November 1876, and was called to the bar 17 November 1879.

Career

He was appointed Queen's Advocate for the Gold Coast Colony in 1888 and promoted to Chief Justice the following year. He then served as Chief Justice of the Windward Islands in 1894, then as Chief Justice of Grenada from 1895 to 1897, and as Chief Justice of Cyprus from 1898 to 1906.

He was appointed Chief Justice of Ceylon on 23 October 1906, succeeding Charles Layard, and was Chief Justice until 1911. He was succeeded by Alfred Lascelles.

Retirement and death

Upon his retirement in 1911, he returned to Cumberland, where he was appointed High Sheriff for the year of 1918. He died in Ravenglass on 20 January 1924.

References

External links
 
 "A Gold Coast Detective" (1918)

1850 births
1924 deaths
Members of the Middle Temple
Chief Justices of British Ceylon
20th-century Sri Lankan people
19th-century Sri Lankan people
Sri Lankan people of British descent
19th-century British people
British Windward Islands judges
Gold Coast (British colony) people
British Cyprus judges
Knights Bachelor
Chief justices of Grenada
People from Ravenglass